Stipčević is a Croatian surname. Notable people with the surname include:

Aleksandar Stipčević (1930–2015), Croatian bibliographer, librarian, and historian
Rok Stipčević (born 1986), Croatian basketball player

Croatian surnames